Frederick is a 1967 children's book by Leo Lionni.  The book is about a group of field mice who are gathering food, except the titular mouse who prefers to store up something special for the winter instead. The book won a 1968 Caldecott Honor for its illustrations and is listed in the literary reference book 1001 Children's Books You Must Read Before You Grow Up.

References

1967 children's books
American picture books
Caldecott Honor-winning works